Massachusetts Senate's 1st Suffolk district in the United States is one of 40 legislative districts of the Massachusetts Senate. It covers portions of Suffolk  county. Democrat Nick Collins of South Boston has represented the district since 2018.

Until 2013, the district's seat had "long been regarded as the 'Southie Seat,'...held by a white, Irish-American, South Boston man."

Locales represented
The district includes parts of the city of Boston.

Former locales
The district previously covered the following:
 Chelsea, circa 1860s
 North Chelsea, circa 1860s
 Winthrop, circa 1860s

Senators 
 Nehemiah Boynton, circa 1859 
 Alfred Hall
 John Edward Beck
 Edward Cox
 John F. Donovan, circa 1935 
 William R. Conley, circa 1945 
 Harold Wilson Canavan, circa 1957 
 Joseph J. C. DiCarlo, circa 1969 
 Bill Bulger, circa 1979-1993 
 John A. Hart, Jr., circa 2002-2013 
Linda Dorcena. Forry, circa 2013-2018
 Nick Collins, 2018-current

Images
Portraits of legislators

See also
 List of Massachusetts Senate elections
 List of Massachusetts General Courts
 List of former districts of the Massachusetts Senate
 Suffolk County districts of the Massachusetts House of Representatives: 1st, 2nd, 3rd, 4th, 5th, 6th, 7th, 8th, 9th, 10th, 11th, 12th, 13th, 14th, 15th, 16th, 17th, 18th, 19th

References

External links
 Ballotpedia
  (State Senate district information based on U.S. Census Bureau's American Community Survey).
 League of Women Voters of Boston

Senate 
Government of Suffolk County, Massachusetts
Massachusetts Senate